Francisco Silva may refer to:

 Francisco Silva (footballer, born 1986), Chilean former professional midfielder
 Francisco Silva (Portuguese footballer), Portuguese footballer
 Francisco Silva (Mexican footballer), Mexican footballer born 1983
 Francisco Silva (footballer, born 1983), Uruguayan-born Chilean midfielder